Eduardo Manahan Año (born October 26, 1961) is a Filipino public official and retired general of the Philippine Army who currently serves as the National Security Adviser under the administration of President Bongbong Marcos since 2023. He previously served as Secretary of the Interior and Local Government in the Cabinet of President Rodrigo Duterte from 2018 to 2022, the Chief of Staff of the Armed Forces of the Philippines from 2016 to 2017, and the Commanding General of the Philippine Army from 2015 to 2016. At the onset of the COVID-19 pandemic in the Philippines, Año, along with the rest of the Philippine government's Cabinet Secretaries, became part of the Inter-Agency Task Force for the Management of Emerging Infectious Diseases, a task force formed to advise the President on the strategies which would effectively manage the spread of COVID-19 in the country.

Life and career

Military career

Eduardo Manahan Año was born in San Mateo, Rizal on October 26, 1961. He graduated elementary as valedictorian. He entered the Philippine Military Academy and became a member of the PMA Matikas class of 1983, where he graduated as Cum Laude. He is also a graduate of the Scout Ranger Course and took courses in the U.S. Army Intelligence Center and School in Arizona, and in the Israel Counter Terrorism Center in 2002. He finished on the top of his class in the International Officer Intelligence Course at Fort Huachuca, Arizona in 1993, by earning a 100 percent grade rating in the course.  He also graduated Number One in all the military career courses he undertook namely; Command and General Staff Course, Infantry Officers Advance Course, Infantry Officers Basic Course and Tactical Intelligence Officer Course.

Año held various military positions primarily in the Military Intelligence Positions, before being appointed in infantry positions, such as the Commander of the Intelligence and Security Group of the Philippine Army, the Chief of the Intelligence Service of the Armed Forces of the Philippines, the Commander of the 10th Infantry (Agila) Division,  In the years of his military service, he led the capture of Benito and Wilma Tiamzon of the Communist Party of the Philippines in 2014, as well as the death of a New People's Army Commander, Leonardo Pitao, known as "Kumander Prago" in his term as commander of the 10th Infantry Division. Año also served as the 57th Commanding General of the Philippine Army from July 14, 2015, to December 7, 2016, after he succeeded General Hernando Iriberri, where he continued his predecessor's approach in modernizing the Army while further enhancing the Army's intelligence capabilities, and strengthening the country's alliances with other countries such as the United States and ASEAN member states. Año was eventually named the 48th Chief of Staff of the Armed Forces of the Philippines after serving his term as Army chief for 1 year and 5 months, from December 7, 2016, to October 26, 2017.

He received the Philippine Military Academy Cavalier Award in 1996 as an outstanding PMA Alumnus in the field of Army Operations. He is also a recipient of the Philippine Legion of Honor (Degree of Chief Commander) and the Panglima Gagah Angkatan Tentera (PGAT) by the King of Malaysia.

Battle of Marawi
During his term as the Chief of Staff of the AFP, he initiated and oversaw overall military operations against the Maute and Abu Sayyaf terrorist groups during the 5-month long Battle of Marawi and launched an offensive operation to retake Marawi City and secure the city's outskirts to prevent any terrorist reinforcements entering the city, while encircling the city from all directions. Afterwards, he was appointed Martial Law Administrator in Mindanao during the declaration of martial law under Proclamation No. 216. As Año's term as Chief of Staff was schedule to end within October 26, 2017, he spent his last weeks in office finalizing the AFP's final offensive within Marawi City and killing the terrorist group's two key commanders, Isnilon Hapilon and Omar Maute on October 16, 2017. 1 week later, on October 23, 2017, Año, along with Defense Secretary Delfin Lorenzana announced the end of all military operations within Marawi City. Año formally retired from military three days after the declaration of the conclusion of the Marawi Siege and was replaced by then-commander of the AFP Eastern Mindanao Command, Lieutenant General Rey Leonardo Guerrero.

Secretary of the Interior and Local Government
President Rodrigo Duterte designated Año as officer-in-charge of the Department of the Interior and Local Government in January 2018. Año could not be given the secretary post immediately because Republic Act 6975 prevents a retired or resigned military officer from being appointed as a secretary within one year from the date of their retirement or resignation. He formally took oath as Secretary of the Interior and Local Government on November 6, 2018.

As the secretary of the Department of the Interior and Local Government, Año ordered local chief executives to spearhead the fight against COVID-19 in their own areas of jurisdictions. He also exacted accountability from LGU and barangay officials who violate the policies, guidelines, and protocols issued by the IATF-EID.

Año ordered the shift in the government's counter-insurgency drive, involving governors, mayors, and village chiefs to ensure good local governance and shared accountability with the private sector, civil society organizations, and the citizenry to address the issues which cause rifts and misunderstandings between government and the people. His term as secretary ended on June 30, 2022, the last day of the Duterte administration.

National Security Adviser
On January 14, 2023, President Bongbong Marcos appointed Año as National Security Adviser.

Awards
 Order of Lakandula with the rank of Grand Cross
 PMA Cavalier Award for Army Operations in 1996
 PMA Cavalier Award for Public Administration in 2021
 PMA Outstanding Achievement Award as Secretary, Department of Interior and Local Government
 PMA Outstanding Achievement Award as Chief of Staff Armed Forces of the Philippines
 PMA Outstanding Achievement Award as Commanding General Philippine Army
 Philippine Legion of Honor- Degree of Commander in 2017
 Philippine Legion of Honor- Degree of Commander in 2016
 Panglima Gagah Angkatan Tentera (PGAT)
 4 Distinguished Service Star
 Gold Cross Medal
 Silver Cross Medal
 24 Bronze Cross Medal for intelligence operations
 36 Military Merit Medals
 10 Military Commendation Medal
 Silver Wing Medal
 Gawad sa Kaunlaran
 Sagisag ng Ulirang Kawal
  Military Civic Action Medal
 Parangal sa Kapanalig ng Sandatahang Lakas ng Pilipinas
 Long Service Medal
  Anti-Dissidence Campaign Medal & Ribbon
 Luzon Anti Dissidence Campaign Medal
 Mindanao Anti-Dissidence Campaign Medal
 Jolo and Sulu Campaign Medal
 Disaster Relief & Rehabilitation Operation Ribbon
  Philippine Republic Presidential Unit Citation
 Martial Law Unit Citation
 People Power I Unit Citation
 People Power II Unit Citation
 Special Forces Qualification Badge
 Combat Commander's Badge (Philippines)
  Scout Ranger Qualification Badge
  Philippine Army Command and General Staff Course Badge
 PAF Gold Wings Badge
 Most Outstanding Anak ng San Mateo, Rizal Award - 2022

Personal life 
Eduardo Año is married to Jean Joselyn Maria R. Dioso and they have four children namely, Edwin Jr., Edward, Janelle Marie and Jasmine Claire.

References

1961 births
Living people
Secretaries of the Interior and Local Government of the Philippines
Chairmen of the Joint Chiefs (Philippines)
Philippine Army generals
People of the Philippine Drug War
Benigno Aquino III administration personnel
Duterte administration cabinet members
Philippine Military Academy alumni
Recipients of the Philippine Legion of Honor
Recipients of the Distinguished Service Star
Recipients of the Bronze Cross Medal
Recipients of the Military Merit Medal (Philippines)
Recipients of the Military Commendation Medal
Recipients of the Silver Wing Medal
Recipients of the Gold Cross (Philippines)
Recipients of the Philippine Republic Presidential Unit Citation